Philip Bloom may refer to:

 Philip Bloom (businessman), American businessman
 Philip Bloom (filmmaker) (born 1971), British filmmaker